This is a Dutch name; the family name is De Vries, not Vries. Not to be confused with Stefan de Vrij. For other uses, see De Vries.

Stefan de Vries (born 13 June 1970) is a Dutch writer and journalist.

De Vries was born in Middelburg and grew up in Zeeland. He studied law at the University of Amsterdam. In 1999 he moved to Paris, where he worked for Prisma Presse. A few years later he finished a director's course at the New York Film Academy. He then studied Art History and Archeology at the Paris-Sorbonne University. Since 2005 he is full-time journalist.

De Vries currently is a news correspondent in France for RTL Nieuws and Euronews. He comments on French politics in the TV-shows 'Politics' or 'The World This Week' on France 24. In December 2015, de Vries started his own podcast called "So French".

On 26 June 2012, he received the Prix de l’Initiative européenne from the Maison de l'Europe de Paris for his journalistic work. On 13 June 2013, he received the EuroNederlander Award 2013 from the European Movement Netherlands (EBN) for his "outstanding and constructive contribution to the European debate in the Netherlands".

Bibliography
 Stefan de Vries, De Francyclopedie ("The Francyclopedia"), New Tailor Holding, 2009, 
 Roel Wolbrink & Stefan de Vries, Het blauwe boekje ("The Little Blue Book"), Bluebeard Publications, 2017, 
 Stefan de Vries & Marijn Kruk, Onder mijn zolen! ("Under my soles!"), New Tailor Holding, 2011,

References

External links

1970 births
Dutch journalists
Dutch television presenters
Dutch podcasters
Dutch expatriates in France
Dutch reporters and correspondents
Living people
New York Film Academy alumni
People from Middelburg, Zeeland
University of Amsterdam alumni
University of Paris alumni